Boresch may refer to the following persons:

Boresch I, a Bohemian prince
Boresch II of Riesenburg, a Bohemian prince
Boresch III of Ossegg and Riesenburg, a Bohemian prince
Boresch IV of Riesenburg, a Bohemian prince
Hans Boresch, a German painter and copperplate engraver.